Kanon may refer to:

Buddhism
 Kanon, a Japanese name for Guanyin, a Buddhist spiritual figure

Media and literature
 Kanon (video game), a Japanese visual novel by Key, later adapted into anime series
 Kanon (manga), a manga by Chiho Saito
 Daimajin Kanon, a Japanese tokusatsu television drama
 Der Kanon, an anthology of important German literature
 The Kanon Award, one of the movie awards of Norwegian film festival Kosmorama

People
 Kanon (bassist) (21st century), Japanese bassist and member of An Cafe
 Kanon (singer) (born 1980), Japanese singer
 Kanon Fukuda (born 1995), Japanese singer and voice actress
 Kanon Kasuga (born 2003), Japanese actress
 Kanon Kimoto (born 1997), a former member of the Japanese idol girl group SKE48
 Kanon Mori (born 1996), Japanese field hockey
 Kanon Miyahara (born 1996), Japanese actress and karate performer 
 Kanon Shizaki, Japanese voice actress
 Kanon Suzuki (born 1998), Japanese singer and member of Morning Musume
 Kanon Takao (born 2002), Japanese voice actress
 Kanon Tani (born 2004), Japanese child actress
 Kanon Wakeshima (born 1988), Japanese singer and cellist
 Joseph Kanon (born 1946), American novelist
 Wilfried Kanon (born 1993), Ivorian professional footballer

Fictional characters
 Kanon, a character from visual novel and anime series Umineko When They Cry
 Kanon, a character in the video game Wild Arms 2
 Gemini Kanon, a character from the manga and anime series Saint Seiya
 Kanon Ichinose, a character from the tokusatsu series Idol x Warrior Miracle Tunes
 Kanon Maldini, a character from the anime series Code Geass: Lelouch of the Rebellion
 Kanon Nakagawa, a character from the manga and anime series The World God Only Knows
 Kanon Shibuya, the protagonist from the anime series Love Live! Superstar!!
Kanon Endou, a character from the anime movie Inazuma Eleven: Saikyō Gundan Ōga Shūrai

Music
Kanon, German spelling of canon in music
Kanon, Op. 59 No. 4, composition by Max Reger
Kanon D major, Op. 63 No. 11, composition by Max Reger
Kanon, 1930, a composition by Alban Berg
Kanon, or canon, a structured hymn in the Orthodox Church, such as the Great Kanon of St. Andrew of Crete
Kanon Pokajanen by Arvo Pärt 
"Kanon", a 2005 song by Enon from Lost Marbles & Exploded Evidence
Kanōn, or monochord, a one-stringed instrument

Places
 Kanon-machi Station, a tram station in Hiroshima
 Punt Kanon, a point at the extreme southeast of Curaçao

Artillery
 4cm kanón vz. 36, an anti-tank gun produced by the Škoda Works in 1930s
 7.5 cm kanon PL vz. 37, a Czech anti-aircraft gun used in World War II
 8 cm kanon vz. 28, a Czech field gun used in World War II
 8 cm kanon vz. 30, a Czech field gun used in World War II
 8.35 cm PL kanon vz. 22, a Czech anti-aircraft gun used in World War II
 9 cm kanon PL vz. 12/20, a Czech anti-aircraft gun used in World War II
 10.5 cm kanon m/34, a heavy field gun produced in Sweden
 Bofors 15,2 cm kanon m/42, a naval gun for use on ships

Other uses
 : one of the sources of Japanese pronunciation

See also
 Canon (disambiguation)
 Cannon (disambiguation)
 Kanoon (disambiguation)
 Qanun (disambiguation)

Japanese feminine given names